Jonathan Black is a British author, known for his conspiracy theory books The Secret History of the World and The Sacred History: How Angels, Mystics and Higher Intelligence Made Our World. He is in the charge of Century, an imprint of Random House UK.

Biography
Jonathan Black is the nom de plume of Mark Booth. He was educated at Ipswich School and Oriel College, Oxford, where he studied Philosophy and Theology. He has worked in publishing for over twenty years.

Works
The Secret History of the World (2007), available from Quercus Books UK.
The Sacred History: How Angels, Mystics and Higher Intelligence Made Our World (2013)
The Secret History of Dante: Unearthing the Mysteries of the Inferno (ebook)

See also
 Mythology
 Graham Hancock

References

External links
 Official website

Living people
British non-fiction writers
21st-century British writers
British male writers
Year of birth missing (living people)
Male non-fiction writers